The 2015 Polish Super Cup was held on 10 July 2015 between the 2014–15 Ekstraklasa winners Lech Poznań and the 2014–15 Polish Cup winners Legia Warsaw. Lech won the match 3–1  and won the trophy for the fifth time.

Match details

See also
2014–15 Ekstraklasa
2014–15 Polish Cup

References

SuperCup
Polish Super Cup